"The Waters of Mars" is the third episode of the 2008–2010 specials of the British science fiction television series Doctor Who, which was first broadcast on BBC One on 15 November 2009.

The story is set on Mars in the year 2059 where the Doctor encounters the first human colony, Bowie Base One. This is commanded by Captain Adelaide Brooke, who turns out to be a pivotal character in the history of humanity. The Doctor must decide whether to use his knowledge of her fate to change history. According to Doctor Who writer and producer Russell T Davies, the special is closely linked to the next two episodes but is not the first part of a three-part story.

The special was dedicated to Barry Letts, the former writer and producer of Doctor Who who died in October 2009. The episode won the 2010 Hugo Award for Best Dramatic Presentation, Short Form.

Plot
The Tenth Doctor arrives at humanity's first colony on Mars, Bowie Base One, in 2059. Inside, he is detained by its crew led by Captain Adelaide Brooke. As they interrogate him, he discovers that today is a "fixed point" in time; the base will explode, killing the entire crew, but Adelaide's death will inspire her granddaughter to explore the stars. He tries to stay uninvolved, but Adelaide forces him to assist her in responding to an alert from the remote biodome.

Three of the crew are infected by an intelligent virus known as the Flood, which spread from the underground glacier the base was using for water. Adelaide realises the remaining crew could not yet have touched the source of water as it had yet to cycle from the biodome to the main hub at the time the water filter broke. She orders the crew to evacuate to their rocket back to Earth. The Doctor starts walking back when he hears cries for help: the infected crew have broken the biodome seal and are now attacking the central hub with massive amounts of water, infecting several others. The rocket's pilot is infected, but he sacrifices himself by causing the rocket to self-destruct to strand the Flood, at the cost of stranding the remaining crew as well.

The Doctor rescues Adelaide and the last surviving crew via the TARDIS moments before the base explodes (as ordered by Adelaide), killing all the infected beings and the Flood itself. He returns them to Earth, arriving outside Adelaide's home. The Doctor insists that he now has the power to change the future of the human race and no-one can stop him. Declaring these actions wrong and not knowing how this would impact her granddaughter's exploration of space, Adelaide steps into her home and kills herself. The Doctor is shocked; he realises that history has not changed. Ood Sigma appears in the street. The Doctor sees this as a message and asks if it is time for him to die. Unresponsive, Sigma vanishes.

Production

"The Waters of Mars" was originally conceived as a Christmas special with the title "Red Christmas". In this story's accompanying episode of Doctor Who Confidential, it was confirmed that Bowie Base One is named after David Bowie, the writer and singer of "Life on Mars?". Filming for the special began on 23 February 2009. In late February, David Tennant, Duncan and other actors were seen filming in Victoria Place, Newport. The filming took place on a city street, which the production team covered with artificial snow. The glasshouse scenes were filmed in the National Botanic Garden of Wales, Carmarthenshire. Also present during filming were a small robot inscribed with the word "GADGET" and Ood Sigma from the 2008 episode "Planet of the Ood". The robot was included in a promotional image released on the official Doctor Who website.

Producer Nikki Wilson described Captain Adelaide Brooke, played by actress Lindsay Duncan, as "the Doctor's cleverest and most strong-minded companion yet." David Tennant said, "Well, she's not really a companion like the others have been... She's very wary of the Doctor; she's not the sort of person you could imagine hooking up with him and riding off into the sunset... she's kind of the alpha male in the room, really. So, the Doctor has to learn to assume a slightly different role when he's around her."

Trailer
A 30-second teaser trailer for this episode aired after the broadcast of "Planet of the Dead". On 9 July 2009, a short clip of the episode was made available online. On 28 July 2009, a longer trailer was shown at the 2009 San Diego Comic Con, which was posted on the BBC website soon afterwards. On 8 November 2009, a short trailer was played on BBC One.

Broadcast and reception

According to overnight viewing figures, "The Waters of Mars" was watched by 9.1 million people. The episode also received an Appreciation Index score of 88 (considered Excellent). More accurate, consolidated statistics from the BARB state that official ratings ended up at 10.32 million viewers for the UK premiere and that "The Waters of Mars" was the fifth most watched programme of the week.

"The Waters of Mars" achieved relatively high ratings in the United States, drawing over 1.1 million viewers: at the time the highest ever primetime rating for BBC America (later beaten by the Series 5 opener followed by the Series 6 opener).

Critical reception was generally positive. Sam Wollaston of The Guardian complimented the episode for showing "a side to the Doctor ... that we haven't really seen before – indecisive, confused, at times simply plain wrong" and Tennant's tenure of the part overall as bringing "humanity and humour to the part", with his only criticism being of "the irritating little robot, Gadget". Though Robert Colvile of The Daily Telegraph criticised "the glaring inconsistencies" between this episode and the Doctor's previous frequent historical interventions, he complimented the scenario for "allow[ing] us to watch Tennant wrestle with his conscience and curiosity ... [in what] was a logical progression for the character".

Like Wollaston, Colvile was "not sure what the children will have made of it, but it set things up intriguingly for Tennant’s final two-part adventure". Zap2it's Sam McPherson named it the fifth best Tenth Doctor episode, describing it as "fun" and "dark" and noting the character development of the Doctor.

"The Waters of Mars" won the 2010 Hugo Award for Best Dramatic Presentation, Short Form, over the two previous Doctor Who specials, "The Next Doctor" and "Planet of the Dead".

Soundtrack

Selected pieces of score from this special, as composed by Murray Gold, were included in the specials soundtrack on 4 October 2010, released by Silva Screen Records.

In print

A Target novelisation of this story, written by Phil Ford, was announced on 19 January 2023, to be released in July.

References

External links

 Doctor Who stories set on Mars
2009 British television episodes
2009 television specials
Articles containing video clips
British television specials
Fiction set in 2059
Hugo Award for Best Dramatic Presentation, Short Form-winning works
Mars in television
Television shows written by Russell T Davies
Tenth Doctor episodes
Works about astronauts
Science fiction television specials
Television episodes about viral outbreaks
Television episodes set in the 2050s